Salome is a 1953 American drama Biblical film directed by William Dieterle and produced by Buddy Adler from a screenplay by Harry Kleiner and  Jesse Lasky Jr. The music score was by George Duning, the dance music by Daniele Amfitheatrof and the cinematography by Charles Lang. Rita Hayworth's costumes were designed by Jean Louis. Hayworth's dances for this film were choreographed by Valerie Bettis. This film was the last produced by Hayworth's production company, the Beckworth Corporation.

The film stars Rita Hayworth as Salome, as well as Stewart Granger, Charles Laughton and Judith Anderson, with Cedric Hardwicke, Alan Badel and Basil Sydney.

Plot
In Galilee, during the rule of Rome's Tiberius Caesar (Cedric Hardwicke), King Herod (Charles Laughton) and Queen Herodias (Judith Anderson) sit on the throne and are condemned by a prophet known as John the Baptist (Alan Badel). Herodias resents John's denunciation of her marriage to the king, her former husband's brother, for which John labels her an adulteress. The king is not pleased with the Baptist condemning his rule, but fears he will face the same fate his father, the elder Herod, suffered after ordering the murder of firstborn males when Jesus was born. The prophecy states that if a king of Judea kills the Messiah, he will suffer an agonizing death. The king believes John the Baptist is the Messiah because of the mistaken belief of some peasants.

After Marcellus, nephew of Caesar, petitions his uncle to marry Salome, he receives a message stating that he is forbidden to marry a "barbarian." Salome is also sent a message stating that she is banished from Rome for seeking to rise above her station, and will be escorted back to Galilee, despite having lived in Rome since childhood. When Marcellus does nothing to protest Caesar's decree, she declares that she shall never love another Roman.

On the boat escorting her home, Salome meets Claudius, a Roman soldier assigned to the palace of Herod. He is amused by her haughty behavior and thwarts her attempt to order him around when she demands to use drinking water instead of sea water for her bath aboard the ship. When he brings sea water instead, she slaps him. He interrupts her angry tirade by stealing a long kiss, which shocks her.

Queen Herodias greets her daughter warmly when she arrives at the palace, and becomes aware of the lecherous intentions of the king, who marvels at the beauty of his stepdaughter/niece. The queen sends Salome away and consults with her advisor, who agrees that the queen can use the king's desire for Salome for her own benefit. Meanwhile, Salome sneaks into the marketplace with several servants to hear John the Baptist speak. When he calls her mother an adulteress, she repudiates him, inadvertently revealing her identity. She is then is spared from the angry crowd by John the Baptist, who calms them and denounces violence. Salome returns to the palace, upset by what she has heard. She implores her mother to leave Galilee with her for her safety, but Herodias claims that she is trapped in a loveless and potentially deadly marriage to the king because she wishes to preserve the throne for Salome's sake. Although Salome does not care about the throne, Herodias insists on its importance, and exaggerates her fear of being stoned to death by John the Baptist's followers. Knowing of Claudius's feelings for her, Salome seductively beguiles him in an attempt to have him arrest John the Baptist to spare her mother's potential death as an adulteress. When he refuses her request, she exits the room in anger.

Shortly after, the king decides to arrest John the Baptist, ostensibly for treason but in reality to protect him from the actions of his wife, who has attempted to have him assassinated. The trial ends with the king imprisoning John the Baptist. Salome hears that the prophet has been arrested; she thinks that Claudius did it for her, and apologizes to him for her behavior the night before. After she leaves, Claudius rushes to the king to plead for John the Baptist's release, but is unable to persuade him. He then rushes off to Jerusalem on horseback to seek his release.

The king visits Salome, who bids Claudius farewell from the balcony, and is irritated that she pays him attention. Herod attempts to gift her a necklace, and suggests she "find pleasure in the moment." Knowing the implications of his gift, she rejects it, reminding him that his queen is her mother. Claudius meets with Pontius Pilate in Jerusalem, who refuses to release the Baptist because he preaches against Rome, which is treasonous. He dismisses the Baptist as a threat, and tells Claudius there are many such prophets in the land, mentioning a miracle worker in Jerusalem. Claudius confesses he is a follower of the Baptist and the religion he preaches, and attempts to persuade Pilate to join him as a champion of this new religion. Pilate relieves him from his post and forbids Claudius from returning to Galilee, but does not arrest him because of their friendship.

Exiting their meeting, Claudius learns of where the miracle worker is located, and travels to see him. He then returns to the palace, where Salome runs to greet him with a tearful embrace. During his departure, Herodias has manipulated Salome into thinking that the only way she can save her mother's life is by dancing for the king. Salome is appalled by this suggestion, as it would mean surrendering her will and body to Herod, and becoming his possession. She pleads with Claudius to take her from Galilee, but he tells her that he needs to reveal something to her before they can leave. He then leads Salome to John the Baptist's cell, where she discovers he is a Christian convert. Claudius tells them both of the miracle worker, whom John recognizes as his kinsman, the Messiah. John's faith and words move Salome, who resolves to save his life.

Claudius and Salome both rush off to try to put their plans to save John into action. Claudius clashes with the palace guards in an attempt to free John from his cell. Against Claudius's wishes, who knows what happens to those who dance for the king, Salome dances a wild, enchanting dance in which she removes layers of clothing (the dance of the seven veils), which she knows will please Herod. At the end of her dance she will ask him to set John free. Herod, enthralled by her dance, offhandedly muses that he would give half his kingdom for Salome. Seated beside him, Herodias quickly seizes the chance to ask him to order John's death, and John is beheaded before Salome finishes her dance. Horrified, she renounces her mother Herodias, who planned and ordered the execution, and like Claudius, becomes a Christian convert. The last scene shows Salome and Claudius listening to Christ (whose face is not shown) delivering the Sermon on the Mount.

Cast
 Rita Hayworth as Princess Salome
 Stewart Granger as Commander Claudius
 Charles Laughton as King Herod
 Judith Anderson as Queen Herodias
 Sir Cedric Hardwicke as Tiberius Caesar
 Alan Badel as John the Baptist
 Basil Sydney as Pontius Pilate
 Maurice Schwartz as Ezra the King's Advisor
 Arnold Moss as Micha the Queen's Advisor
 Asoka as Oriental Dancer
 Sujata as Oriental Dancer

Production
The original title of the film was Salome - Dance of the Seven Veils. The film was based on the book The Good Tidings by William Sidney; Robert Ardrey wrote the first script. It was made for Hayworth's own company, Beckworth Productions, for Columbia Release.

According to her biographers, Hayworth's erotic Dance of the Seven Veils routine was "the most demanding of her entire career", necessitating "endless takes and retakes".

Stewart Granger was borrowed from MGM for the male lead.

Reception
The film was a big hit in France, with admissions of 3,047,090.

Bosley Crowther of The New York Times called the film "a flamboyant, Technicolored romance" with "a righteously sanctimonious air, suggesting the whole thing is intended to be taken on a high religious plane." Variety wrote that Hayworth's performance was "among her best," but "the film doesn't deliver on the promised sex-religion combo and needs more hokum, spectacle and excitement to click with the regular run of filmgoers." Edwin Schallert of the Los Angeles Times called the film "a gaudy and garish affair" with its primary weakness being "discovering just what sort of a woman Salome is supposed really to be. Neither story creators nor Rita herself cast too much light on that." Orval Hopkins of The Washington Post called it "gee-whiz picture" with "tremendous" color shots, "startling" scenes aboard the Roman galley and some acting "of the scenery-chewing variety. Altogether, this is a whale of a spectacle." Harrison's Reports declared, "It is a fairly spectacular production, has fine photography, and considerable sex exposure, but the story does not touch one's heartstrings." The Monthly Film Bulletin wrote, "Salome seems wholly fake, even its vulgarity strikes one as lifeless ... Rita Hayworth, though she performs her dances like a Trojan, seems sadly to have lost her earlier vitality. The generally oppressive and shoddy atmosphere, in fact, is relieved only by hilarious over-playing by Judith Anderson as Herodias."

References

External links

 
 
 
 
Review of film at Variety

1953 drama films
Columbia Pictures films
1953 films
Films scored by George Duning
Films based on the Gospels
Films directed by William Dieterle
Cultural depictions of John the Baptist
Portrayals of Jesus in film
Religious epic films
Cultural depictions of Pontius Pilate
Films with screenplays by Harry Kleiner
American drama films
Cultural depictions of Salome
1950s English-language films
1950s American films